Gertrude Lamson (October 8, 1874 – February 7, 1965), known professionally as Nance O'Neil or Nancy O'Neil, was an American stage and film actress who performed in plays in various theaters around the world but worked predominantly in the United States between the 1890s and 1930s. At the height of her career, she was promoted on theater bills and in period trade publications and newspapers as the "American Bernhardt".

Early life
O'Neil was born in Oakland, California to George Lamson and Arre Findley.<ref>GREAT STARS OF THE AMERICAN STAGE" by Daniel Blum c. 1952 Profile #36</ref>

Stage career

O'Neil's first performance in a professional production was in the role of a nun in Sarah at the Alcazar Theatre in San Francisco on October 16, 1893. Before returning to San Francisco in 1898 and 1899 as a star, headlining in the plays The Jewess and The Shadow, she spent the preceding years honing her acting skills by playing in every type of venue, "from barns to first-class theatres", in towns throughout the country's West and Northwest."HUNTING 'LOCAL COLOR': Adventures of an American Dramatist in the Gold-Mining Country", The New York Times, November 26, 1899, p. 18. ProQuest Historical Newspapers. O'Neil later described that early period of her career as a time when she appeared "in fully a hundred characters, varying from soubrettes to heavies."

As her celebrity grew, after her success in San Francisco, O'Neil embarked on an around-the-world tour, performing in Hawaii, Australia, Egypt, and in many other locations overseas. Those extensive travels and stage appearances were managed by McKee Rankin—an actor, manager, and producer—who was instrumental in also making her a star in Australia and in overseeing her London debut at the Adelphi Theatre on September 1, 1902, in the play Magda. The next day, back in the United States, The New York Times reported on that important performance in England, noting that in the early acts of the play O'Neil "gave an  intense, imperious and unequal rendering of the part." The newspaper, however, then added that the actress's "nervousness" later eased on stage and she "aroused the big audience to enthusiasm in the climax of the third act, and obtained a good reception."In 1899, McKee Rankin and O'Neil were rumored to have married but the announcement was subsequently declared incorrect. Also, the cited September 2, 1902 news report in The New York Times confirms that Rankin was still traveling with O'Neil in 1902 on her world tour. The newspaper states that Rankin was among the cast in Magda, performing in London in the role of Colonel Schwartze. Unfortunately, two other plays in which O'Neil also starred in London that same month—Camille and Elizabeth, Queen of England—were poorly received by English critics and forced her to terminate early her plans for additional engagements there in October 1902. The London Times wholly dismissed her company's presentation of Camille as "flauntingly, overwhelming provincial" and criticized her performance in Elizabeth, Queen of England as "lacking tenderness".

In 1906, in her role as the title character in an adaptation of Leah, the Forsaken, O'Neil recreated the role made famous by Italian actress Adelaide Ristori. She also appeared in Trilby, Camille, The Common Standard, The Wanderer, Macbeth, Agnes, Sappho, The Passion Flower, Hedda Gabler, and many other productions in the United States and Europe. In 1908 a theater critic for The New York Times shared his opinions regarding O'Neil's acting talents, providing what he viewed as both the strengths and weaknesses of her performances:

The statuesque O'Neil performed in Louisville, Kentucky, opposite such actors as Wilton Lackaye, Edmund Breese, William Faversham, Thomas A. Wise, and Harriet MacGibbon. There were regular productions, including Ned McCobb's Daughter, The Front Page, and The Big Fight. 

For over four decades, O'Neil also performed in a wide variety of Broadway productions.  She appeared early in her career in True to Life at the Murray Hill Theatre in Manhattan in 1896 and then, late in her career, in Night in the House at the Booth Theatre in 1935.

Film
O'Neil began acting in silent films with studios in New York and New Jersey before moving to California to work in Hollywood productions. Among her early films are the 1915 drama The Kreutzer Sonata and the 1916 five-reeler The Witch. Both of those motion pictures were filmed at Fox Film Corporation's facilities in Fort Lee, New Jersey. More than a decade later, she made a successful transition to the sound era, although she retired from films after working a few years in the new medium. Some of O'Neil's screen appearances in that period include performances in the 1930 features Ladies of Leisure, The Royal Bed, and The Rogue Song; in the 1931 releases Cimarron and Transgression; and in the 1932 medical drama False Faces, her final film.

Relationship with Lizzie Borden
In 1904, O'Neil met acquitted murder suspect Lizzie Borden while in Boston. The two had a close friendship, which incited considerable gossip.

O'Neil was referenced as a character in the musical Lizzie Borden: A Musical Tragedy in Two Axe, where she was played by Suellen Vance. The women's implied romantic relationship was explored as well in the 2010 play Nance O'Neil by David Foley and the 2006 novel Miss Lizzie by Walter Satterthwait.

O'Neil was also cited as a character in a play by William Norfolk, The Lights are Warm and Colored.  Set in 1905, it uses Lizzie's friendship with O'Neil and other theatrical players as a vehicle for a play within a play.  The actors recreate scenes from the murder trial in an improv-like setting, coached or criticized by Lizzie and Emma.  The play implies that Lizzie was innocent, and the real perpetrator was the maid, who makes a surprise visit at the end.

Marriage and death
O'Neil in 1916 married Alfred Hickman (né Alfred Scott Devereaux-Hickman), a British-born film actor who was previously married to actress Blanche Walsh. The same year that Hickman and O'Neil married, they costarred in the Fox film The Witch. Then they costarred on screen again in 1917, portraying Emperor Nicholas II of Russia and Empress Alexandra in The Fall of the Romanoffs. O'Neil's marriage to Hickman continued for another 14 years, until Alfred's death in 1931.

In her final years, O'Neil resided at the Lillian Booth Actors Home in Englewood, New Jersey. She died there, at age 90, on February 7, 1965. A cinerary urn containing her ashes was transported to Forest Lawn Memorial Park in Glendale, California. There, her remains were placed in the park's columbarium, inside the niche that also holds her husband Alfred's cinerary urn.

Partial filmography

 The Count of Monte Cristo (1913) - Mercedes
 The Kreutzer Sonata (1915) - Miriam Friedlander
 Princess Romanoff (1915) - Princess Fedora Romanoff
 A Woman's Past (1915) - Jane Hawley
 Souls in Bondage (1916) - Rosa Brenner
 The Witch (1916) - Zora Fernandez
 The Flames of Johannis (1916) - Zirah / Marika
 The Toilers (1916) - Jane Brett
 The Iron Woman (1916) - Sarah Maitland
 Greed (1917) - Alma
 The Seventh Sin (1917) - Alma
 Mrs. Balfame (1917) - Mrs. Balfame
 Hedda Gabler (1917) - Hedda Gabler
 The Final Payment (1917) - Nina
 The Fall of the Romanoffs (1917) - Czarina Alexandra
 Seven Deadly Sins (1917) - Alma (Greed) & (Seventh Sin)
 Resurrection (1927)
 His Glorious Night (1929) - Eugenie
 Ladies of Leisure (1930) - Mrs.John Strong
 The Rogue Song (1930) - Princess Alexandra
 The Lady of Scandal (1930) - Lady Trench
 The Florodora Girl (1930) - Mrs. Vibart
 Call of the Flesh (1930) - Mother Superior
 The Eyes of the World (1930) - Myra Willard
 The Royal Bed (1931) - Queen Martha
 Cimarron (1931) - Felice Venable
 Resurrection (1931) - Princess Marya
 The Good Bad Girl (1931) - Mrs. J.P. Henderson
 Transgression (1931) - Honora 'Nora' Maury
 A Woman of Experience (1931) - Countess Runyi
 Their Mad Moment (1931) - Grand Mere
 Secret Service (1931) - Mrs. Varney
 Westward Passage (1932) - Mrs. von Stael (uncredited)
 False Faces (1932) - Mrs. Finn

References and notes

Further reading
 
 John Herbert Gill – Detecting Gertrude Stein And Other Suspects on the Shadow Side of Modernism

External links

 
 Nance O'Neil filmography at the American Film Institute
 Nance O'Neil biography on famousandgay.com
 Nance O'Neil gallery on lizzieandrewborden.com
 How Lizzie Borden Got Away With Murder'' on http://crimemagazine.com
 Straight Dope staff report by John Corrado
  performed by the St. Louis City Players, 1969
  Nance O'Neil page at Corbis
 Nance O'Neil and Elsie Ferguson in "The House of Women"(1927)
Nance O'Neil, gallery ; University of Washington, Sayre collection (*upgraded to new url)

1874 births
1965 deaths
People from Englewood, New Jersey
Actresses from Oakland, California
Vaudeville performers
Burials at Forest Lawn Memorial Park (Glendale)
20th-century American actresses
Burials at Brookside Cemetery (Englewood, New Jersey)